Anna of Hesse and by Rhine (25 May 1843 – 16 April 1865) was the consort and second wife of Friedrich Franz II, Grand Duke of Mecklenburg-Schwerin.

Early life
Anna, third child and only daughter of Prince Karl of Hesse and by Rhine, and his wife, Princess Elisabeth of Prussia, was born at Bessungen, Grand Duchy of Hesse. Her paternal grandfather was Ludwig II, Grand Duke of Hesse and by Rhine. Her mother was a granddaughter of King Friedrich Wilhelm II of Prussia.

Her eldest brother, Ludwig, married in 1862 to Princess Alice of the United Kingdom, third child and second daughter of Queen Victoria.

Marriage
As a young girl, Anna was considered as a possible bride for the future Edward VII (known as 'Bertie' to his family). While his mother, Victoria, was in favor of Anna, Bertie's elder sister was opposed to the match, as she believed Anna had a "disturbing twitch". As time went by however, Victoria grew increasingly impatient, and tried to ignore her daughter's hints that Anna was not suitable, declaring, "I am much pleased with the account of Princess Anna, (minus the twitching)". In the end, Alexandra of Denmark was chosen instead.

On 4 July 1864 in Darmstadt, Anna married Friedrich Franz II, Grand Duke of Mecklenburg-Schwerin son of Paul Friedrich, Grand Duke of Mecklenburg-Schwerin.  (Friedrich Franz's first wife, Princess Augusta Reuss of Köstritz, had died in 1862.)  Together they had one daughter:

HH Duchess Anna Elisabeth Auguste Alexandrine of Mecklenburg-Schwerin (7 April 1865 – 8 February 1882)

Death
Anna died of puerperal fever a week later after giving birth to her only daughter. She was buried at the Schwerin Cathedral. Her husband remarried to Princess Marie of Schwarzburg-Rudolstadt, and fathered by her Duke Henry of Mecklenburg-Schwerin, consort of Wilhelmina of the Netherlands.

Ancestry

References

Sources

thePeerage.com Anne Prinzessin von Hessen und bei Rhein

|-

House of Hesse-Darmstadt
1843 births
1865 deaths
House of Mecklenburg-Schwerin
People from the Grand Duchy of Hesse
Duchesses of Mecklenburg-Schwerin
Grand Duchesses of Mecklenburg-Schwerin
Deaths in childbirth
Burials at Schwerin Cathedral